Andrejs Šeļakovs (born November 8, 1988) is a Latvian basketball player, who plays the center position. He is currently playing for BK Jūrmala of the Latvian league.

Pro career
Andrejs Šeļakovs started his pro career in 2006-2007 with ASK Rīga. Around that time he also was recruited by some major schools from NCAA Division 1, but he opted to stay in Europe. After one season with ASK he moved to VEF Rīga, where he spent four years. For the 2011–12 season he left Latvia for Spain, joining CB Tarragona of LEB Oro, Spanish second league. In beginning of 2012–13 season he played for Barons Kvartāls, but after few games he moved back to Spain, signing with Club Melilla Baloncesto on Christmas 2013.

On 25 September 2013, Šeļakovs signed with Ukrainian side BC Odessa.

In March 2014, Andrejs Šeļakovs signed with Sigal Prishtina.

The 2017–2018 season was a rollercoaster for Šeļakovs. First he signed with Lithuanian team BC Dzūkija, then was released and signed with Betsafe/Liepāja. In January 2018 Šeļakovs signed one-year deal with Legia Warszawa, newcomer of the Polska Liga Koszykówki. In February he left the team and signed with Latvian team BK Jūrmala.

Latvian national team
He has represented Latvia national team in EuroBasket 2011 and Eurobasket 2013.

References

External links
 FIBA Europe profile

1988 births
Living people
ASK Riga players
BC Dzūkija players
BC Odesa players
BK Barons players
BK Jūrmala players
BK Liepājas Lauvas players
BK VEF Rīga players
BK Ventspils players
CB Tarragona players
Centers (basketball)
KB Prishtina players
Latvian expatriate basketball people in Spain
Latvian men's basketball players
Legia Warsaw (basketball) players
Melilla Baloncesto players
People from Dobele